The Battle of Guìlíng (桂陵之戰) was fought between the states of Qí and Wei in the Warring States period of Chinese history. 

In 354 BC, an army from Wèi was laying siege to Handan, the capital of the State of Zhao. The next year, Zhao turned to Qi for help. Tian Ji and Sun Bin, acting as co-commanders of Qi, led an army to save Zhao. Sun Bin moved south intentionally to make an unsuccessful attack on Pingling, intending to convince Pang Juan that the Qi Army was too weak to achieve victory. Pang Juan, falling for the ruse, pooled more of his forces to besiege Handan. Although defeated, the Zhao Army fought desperately and suffered heavy losses to the Wei Army in the subsequent battle. After feigning defeat at Pingling, Sun Bin led his army directly to the Wei capital, Daliang. Wei scouts reported that the Qi Army had committed small groups to attack the city. Upon hearing the report, Wei general Pang Juan took his crack cavalry and left his infantry and supplies at Handan, making a mad dash in an attempt rescue Daliang. Pang Juan's troops were exhausted as they crossed the Yellow River and were ambushed and destroyed at Guiling by Sun's numerically superior army. Pang Juan managed to escape alone to Wei.

This battle gives rise to a well-known proverb, "Besiege Wei to rescue Zhao" (圍魏救趙), which is also included as one of the Thirty-Six Strategies.

Sources

References

Further reading 
Records of the Grand Historian
Sun Bin's Art of War
Sun Bin: The Art of Warfare

354 BC
Guiling
Guiling 354 BC
4th century BC in China
Qi (state)
Wei (state)
Zhao (state)